Ax Handle Saturday, also known as the Jacksonville riot of 1960, was a racially motivated attack that took place in Hemming Park (now known as James Weldon Johnson Park or JWJ Park) in Jacksonville, Florida, on August 27, 1960. A group of white men attacked African Americans who were engaging in sit-in protests opposing racial segregation. The attack took its name from the ax handles used by the attackers.

Background
Because of its high visibility and patronage, Hemming Park and surrounding stores were the site of numerous civil rights demonstrations in the 1960s. Black sit-ins began on August 13, 1960, when students asked to be served at the segregated lunch counter at Woolworths, Morrison's Cafeteria, and other eateries. They were denied service and kicked, spit at and addressed with racial slurs.

Incident
On August 27, 1960, a group of 200 white men who were Ku Klux Klan members gathered in Hemming Park armed with baseball bats and ax handles. They attacked the protesters conducting sit-ins. The violence spread, and the white mob started attacking all African Americans in sight. Rumors were rampant on both sides that the unrest was spreading around the county (in reality, the violence stayed in relatively the same location, and did not spill over into the mostly white, upper-class Cedar Hills neighborhood, for example). A black street gang called the "Boomerangs" came to protect the demonstrators. Although police had not intervened when the protesters were attacked, they became involved, arresting members of the Boomerangs and other black residents who attempted to stop the beatings.

Nat Glover, who later worked in Jacksonville law enforcement for 37 years, including eight years as sheriff of Jacksonville, recalled stumbling into the riot. Glover said he ran to the police, expecting them to arrest the thugs, but was told to leave town or risk being killed.

Several whites had joined the black protesters on that day. Richard Charles Parker, a 25-year-old student attending Florida State University, was among them. White protesters were the object of particular dislike by racists, so when the fracas began, Parker was hustled out of the area for his own protection. The police had been watching him and arrested him as an instigator, charging him with vagrancy, disorderly conduct and inciting a riot. After Parker stated that he was proud to be a member of the NAACP, Judge John Santora sentenced him to 90 days in jail.

Aftermath
Snyder Memorial Methodist Episcopal Church hosted community discussions and negotiations following the incident. Lunch counters in Jacksonville were desegregated in 1961.

See also
List of incidents of civil unrest in the United States

References

Further reading

External links
Ax Handle Saturday, 1960: A day of defiance in black and white (newspaper article)
"Ax Handle Saturday": A dark day in Jacksonville history occurred 56 years ago

1960 in Florida
1960 protests
August 1960 events in the United States
20th century in Jacksonville, Florida
Civil rights movement
Civil rights protests in the United States
History of African-American civil rights
History of racism in Florida
Riots and civil disorder in Florida
African-American history of Florida
White American riots in the United States
African-American history in Jacksonville, Florida